Phthersigena centralis is a species of praying mantis that is endemic to Australia.

See also
List of mantis genera and species

References

Mantidae
Endemic fauna of Australia
Insects described in 1915